VASKhNIL, the acronym for the Lenin All-Union Academy of Agricultural Sciences or the V.I. Lenin Academy of Agricultural Sciences, was the Soviet Union's academy dedicated to agricultural sciences, operating from 1929 to the dissolution of the Soviet Union in 1992.

Built upon the model of the Academy of Sciences of USSR, VASKhNIL included not only a body of academicians but also a vast network of research institutions scattered all over the Union, with thousands of researchers and plant and cattle breeders.

History 

The Academy operated from 1929 to the dissolution of the Soviet Union in 1992.

In the 1930s–40s, meetings of the academy members ('sessions' of VASKhNIL) provided the floor for debates between Lysenkoists and geneticists. After Trofim Lysenko had taken control over the Academy, it became for about thirty years a stronghold of Lysenkoism. The proverbial among Russian biologists  (July 31–August 7, 1948) organised under control of the Communist Party (Joseph Stalin personally corrected the drafts of the Lysenko's opening address "On the Situation in Biological Science") led to a formal ban on teaching "Mendelist-Weismannist-Morganist" genetics (a pejorative label based on the names of Gregor Mendel, August Weismann, and Thomas Hunt Morgan), which was effective until the early 1960s. Soviet plant breeding efforts - largely carried out by the VASKhNIL - were well funded, however not as effective as they might have been. This was partly due to this era of forced Lysenkoism.

The end of the Soviet era in 1991 brought a sudden fall in funding for plant breeding.

See also

 Academy of Sciences of the Soviet Union
 Ministry of Agrarian Policy and Food (Ukraine)
 Science and technology in the Soviet Union
 Lysenkoism

References

External links
 LibWorld - Central Scientific Agricultural Library (CSAL)

 
Russian National Academies
Science and technology in the Soviet Union
Agriculture in the Soviet Union